Viktor (Vihtori) Aromaa (9 November 1872, Sysmä - 27 May 1932; surname until 1906 Zvist) was a Finnish bricklayer and politician. He was a member of the Parliament of Finland from 1907 to 1908, representing the Social Democratic Party of Finland (SDP).

References

1872 births
1932 deaths
People from Sysmä
People from Mikkeli Province (Grand Duchy of Finland)
Social Democratic Party of Finland politicians
Members of the Parliament of Finland (1907–08)
Bricklayers